Mark C. Elliott is the Mark Schwartz Professor of Chinese and Inner Asian History at Harvard University, where he is Vice Provost for International Affairs.  He is also one of the scholars who form part of the school called the New Qing History.

Biography
Elliott's interest in East Asian history began at Yale, where he earned his BA and MA, the latter as a student of Jonathan Spence and Beatrice Bartlett. After several years of study and archival research in Taiwan, mainland China, and Japan, he earned his PhD in 1993 from the University of California, Berkeley, specializing in the history of the Qing dynasty under the guidance of Frederic Wakeman. Thereafter, he taught at the University of California, Santa Barbara from 1993 to 2002. After a year at the University of Michigan, Professor Elliott came to Harvard in 2003 and was named the Mark Schwartz Professor of Chinese and Inner Asian History in the following year. He teaches a wide variety of courses including the History of Relations between China and Inner Asia and the famous "Qing Documents" seminar, and is considered a prominent scholar of the New Qing History school. His The Manchu Way: The Eight Banners and Ethnic Identity in Late Imperial China is a representative work of the Manchu-centered theory of Qing history. Elliott also oversees the Department's instruction in Manchu and Mongolian language. Beginning in 2015, he has served as Vice Provost of International Affairs at Harvard.

In March 2018, Elliott inaugurated Harvard's Lakshmi Mittal South Asia Institute in New Delhi.

Selected works
In a statistical overview derived from writings by and about Mark Elliott OCLC/WorldCat encompasses roughly 10+ works in 20+ publications in 3 languages and 600+ library holdings.  

Books

Emperor Qianlong: Son of Heaven, Man of the World. Pearson-Longman, 2009.
New Qing Imperial History: The Making of Inner Asian Empire at Qing Chengde. Co-edited with James Millward, Ruth Dunnell, and Philippe Forêt. RoutledgeCurzon, 2004.
The Manchu Way: The Eight Banners and Ethnic Identity in Late Imperial China. Stanford University Press, 2001.
The Archives of the Bordered Red Banner: Research Guide to the Qing Eight Banners and Catalogue of Materials in the Toyo Bunko. Co-edited with Kanda Nobuo, et al. Toyo Bunko, 2001.

Selected articles and book chapters

“The Case of the Missing Indigene: Debate over a ‘Second-Generation Ethnic Policy’.”  The China Journal 73 (January 2015), pp. 186-213.
“Abel-Rémusat, la langue mandchoue et la sinologie.”  Comptes Rendues de l’Academie des Inscriptions et Belles-Lettres 2014.2 (April-June), pp. 973-993. Revised version published in Pierre-Etienne Will and Michel Fink, eds., Jean-Pierre Abel-Rémusat et ses successeurs. Deux cents ans de sinologie française en France et en Chine (Paris: Peeters, 2020), pp. 49-69.
“Frontier Stories:  The Periphery as Central in Qing History.” Frontiers of History in China 9.3 (December 2014), pp. 336-360.
“Chuantong Zhongguo shi yige diguo ma” 「传统中国是一个帝国吗」(Was traditional China an empire?).  Dushu 《读书》2014.1, pp. 29-40.
“Ershiyishiji ruhe shuxie Zhongguo lishi: ‘Xin Qingshi’ yanjiu de yingxiang yu huiying” 「21世纪如何书写中国历史：“新清史”研究的影响与回应」(Writing Chinese history in the 21st c.: the influence and response to the “New Qing History”), with Ding Yizhuang 定宜庄.  In Peng Wei 彭卫ed., Lishixue pinglun《历史学评论》(Critical Historical Review), vol. 1 (Beijing: SSAP, 2013), pp. 116-146. 
“Guanyu xin Qingshi de jige wenti” 「关于新清史的几个问题」, in Liu Wenpeng et al., eds., Qingdai zhengzhi yu guojia rentong 《清代政治与国家认同》(Politics and national identity in the Qing) (Beijing: Renmin daxue cbs, 2012), pp. 3-15.  
“Hushuo 胡說: The Northern Other and the Naming of the Han Chinese.” In Thomas Mullaney, et al., eds., Critical Han Studies (Berkeley: University of California Press, 2012).
“National Minds and Imperial Frontiers: Inner Asia and China in the New Century.” In William Kirby, ed., The People’s Republic of China at 60: An International Assessment (Cambridge, MA: Harvard University Press, 2011).
“Shindai Manshūjin no aidentitii to Chūgoku tōchi”「清代満洲人のアイデンティティイと中国統治」 (Manchu identity and rule in the Qing). In Okada Hidehiro, ed., Shinchō to ha nani ka 『清朝とは何か』 (What was the Qing?), Special Number 16 of Kan: History, Environment, Civilization (Tokyo: Fujiwara Shoten, 2009), pp. 108–123.
“Manshū tōan to shin Shinchō shi” 「満洲档案と新清朝史」 (Manchu archives and the new Qing history). In Hosoya Yoshio, ed., Shinchōshi kenkyū no aratanaru chihei 『清朝史研究の新たなる地平』 (New perspectives on Qing historical research) (Tokyo: Yamakawa, 2008, pp. 124–139.
“The Manchus as Ethnographic Subject in the Qing.” In Joseph Esherick, Madelein Zelin, and Wen-hsin Yeh, eds., Empire, Nation, and Beyond: Chinese History in Late Imperial and Modern Times. Berkeley: Institute of East Asian Studies, 2006.
"Manwen dang'an yu xin Qingshi" 「滿文檔案與新清史」 (Manchu archives and the new Qing history). National Palace Museum Quarterly 『故宮博物院季刊』, December 2006.
"La Chine moderne: les mandchous et la définition de la nation." Annales. Histoire, Sciences Sociales, November–December 2006.
"Ethnicity in the Qing Eight Banners." In Pamela Kyle Crossley, Helen Siu, and Donald Sutton, eds., Empire at the Margins: Culture, Ethnicity, and Frontier in Early Modern China. University of California Press, 2006.
"Whose Empire Shall It Be? Manchu Figurations of Historical Process in the Early Seventeenth Century." In Lynn Struve, ed., Time and Temporality in the Ming-Qing Transition (Honolulu: University of Hawai'i Press, 2005), pp. 30–72.
"Highlights of the Manchu-Mongolian Collection." Co-authored with James Bosson. In Patrick Hanan, ed., The Treasures of the Yenching. Harvard-Yenching Institute, 2003.
"The Eating Crabs Youth Book." In Susan Mann and Yu-yin Cheng, eds., Under Confucian Eyes: Documents on Gender in East Asian History. University of California Press, 2001.
"The Manchu-Language Archives of the Qing and the Origins of the Palace Memorial System." Late Imperial China 22.1 (June 2001).
"The Limits of Tartary: Manchuria in Imperial and National Geographies." Journal of Asian Studies 59.3 (August 2000).
"Manchu Widows and Ethnicity in Qing China." Comparative Studies in Society and History 41.1 (January 1999).
"Chūgoku no dai'ichi rekishi tōankanzō naikaku to kyūchū Manbun tōan no gaijutsu" (An outline of the Manchu holdings of the Grand Secretariat and Imperial Palace archives at the No. 1 Historical Archives, Beijing). Tōhōgaku 85 (January 1993).
Bannerman and Townsman: "Ethnic Tension in Nineteenth-Century Jiangnan". Late Imperial China 11.1 (June 1990).

External links
Homepage at Harvard Retrieved 30 April 2013

References

American sinologists
Historians of China
Harvard University faculty
21st-century American historians
American male non-fiction writers
Living people
Year of birth missing (living people)
21st-century American male writers